This article displays the qualifying draw of the 2011 Korea Open.

Players

Seeds

  Erika Sema (withdrew, take part of ITF Ningbo)
  Junri Namigata (second round)
  Rika Fujiwara (qualifying competition)
  Yurika Sema (qualified)
  Karolína Plíšková (second round)
  Marta Domachowska (qualifying competition)
  Krystina Plíšková (qualified)
  Yaroslava Shvedova (qualified)
  Erika Takao (first round)

Qualifiers

  Nicole Rottmann
  Krystina Plíšková
  Yaroslava Shvedova
  Yurika Sema

Qualifying draw

First qualifier

Second qualifier

Third qualifier

Fourth qualifier

References
 Qualifying Draw

2011 - qualifying
Korea Open - qualifying